Riddler's Moon is a television film created for UPN in 1998 for the Thursday Night at the Movies block as part of the six-film Nightworld anthology. It was the second film in the anthology to air on the block. It was subsequently aired again in 1999, before being acquired by the Fox Family Channel in 2000, where it was frequently aired, until the network was purchased by Disney-ABC Television Group in October 2001.

Premise
Previously barren farmland owned by a single mother and her disabled son experiences a supernatural bloom.

Cast 
 Corbin Bernsen....George Brenner
 Kate Mulgrew....Victoria Riddler
 Daniel Newman....Elias Riddler
 Finbar Lynch....Kevin Sanders
 Miles Anderson....Ernie
 William Armstrong....Peter Morley
 Martin East....Ericson
 Angie Hill....Dr. Newton
 Jed Curtis....Butcher
 Frances Nacman....Vet
 Ted Rusoff....Pastor
 Robert Sommer....Bartender

Production
Filming took place in Luxembourg in the summer of 1998.
The production went through many obstacles, mainly with the script, which had to be rewritten multiple times by multiple screenwriters. Lead actress Kate Mulgrew even had to part in the writing of key pages. By the time filming began, only 10% of the original script was left.
The unfortunate circumstances were a result of changes in network executive producers, filming locations, and clashes between executives from Paramount Television, Alliance Atlantis, and RTL Group.

Home Media
In the United States, Riddler's Moon was released in several DVD combo packs in 2010 by Echo Bridge Home Entertainment.

See also
 List of television films produced for UPN

External links
 

1998 films
1998 drama films
American drama television films
1990s English-language films
Films directed by Don McBrearty
1990s American films
UPN original films